You Will Regret (originally and alternatively titled YouWillRegret) is the second mixtape by American rapper Ski Mask the Slump God. It was originally released on June 30, 2017, by Victor Victor Worldwide and Republic Records. The mixtape was reissued, titled You Will Regret (Reloaded) on February 2, 2018, with three extra songs, all previously released as singles. It features guest appearances from XXXTentacion, MadeinTYO, and DirtyFaceSmook. The mixtape debuted at number 195 on the US Billboard 200. The mixtape was supported by three singles: "BabyWipe", "Take a Step Back", and "Catch Me Outside", which are all certified gold by the Recording Industry Association of America (RIAA).

Track listing

Notes
 "Take a Step Back" originally appeared on Ski Mask's debut mixtape Drown in Designer
 "Catch Me Outside" is a remix of "She's a Bitch" by Missy Elliott
 "Psycho" originally appeared on the SoundCloud release before being removed

Sample credits
 "JustLikeMyPiss" contains a sample of "Dujdovna pesen", written by Yordan Yankov and performed by Jeni Batinova.
 "Catch Me Outside" contain samples of "She's a Bitch", written by Melissa Elliott and Timothy Mosley and performed by Missy Elliott.

Personnel
Tony Seltzer – recording (reissue: track 3)
Gavin Dixon – recording (reissue: track 3)
Corey Nutile – recording (reissue: track 5)
Kashaka – recording (reissue: track 6)
DeCicco Beats – recording (reissue: track 7)
Summa Sam – recording (reissue: tracks 9, 11)
Wilgun – mixing (reissue: track 2), recording (reissue: tracks 2, 8, 10)
Fabian Marasciullo – mixing (reissue: tracks 1, 4–13)

Charts

References

2017 mixtape albums
Republic Records albums
Albums produced by Ronny J
Albums produced by Timbaland
Ski Mask the Slump God albums